N. S. Perera was the 22nd Surveyor General of Sri Lanka. He was appointed in 1954, succeeding C. B. King, and held the office until 1958. He was succeeded by V. Rasaretnam.

References

P